The Theater Equation is a live album and DVD/Blu-ray by Arjen Anthony Lucassen's progressive rock/metal rock opera project Ayreon. The Theater Equation originally consisted of a four live performances, with cast, choir and small orchestra, of the 2004 album The Human Equation, as an actual rock opera, complete with mise-en-scène. It is the first Ayreon live release, although Ayreon songs had previously been featured on live albums by two of Lucassen's other musical projects (Live on Earth by Star One and Live in the Real World by Stream of Passion), and marks the first time an Ayreon album was performed live in its entirety. The Theater Equation consisted of four shows, all played in Rotterdam between September 18 and 20, 2015, with the last performance being the one recorded for the album.

The project, directed by Lucassen's former manager Yvette Boertje, originally was to consist of three fan-made concerts performed under the title Ayreon's The Human Equation Theater Experience; however, after some of the original cast and musicians showed interest in the project, the organizers decided to make it a greater venture. Despite using the Ayreon name on promotional material with the blessing of Lucassen, The Theater Equation shows were not official Ayreon concerts; however, the recording was released as an official Ayreon product. The Ayreon Universe shows, which took place in 2017, were the first official Ayreon concerts.

Most of the cast of the original album was featured on the tour, including James LaBrie of Dream Theater (Me), Marcela Bovio of Stream of Passion (Wife), former Mostly Autumn member Heather Findlay (Love), Eric Clayton (Reason), and Irene Jansen (Passion). Despite the announcement that he would not take part of the shows due to his reluctance to play live and that he will only support the project as a support advisor, Lucassen performed the part of the Forever of the Stars; his original, more significant part as Best Friend was performed by Wudstik. Some other regular collaborators of Lucassen joined the project, including drummer Ed Warby, and singer Anneke van Giersbergen who replaced Mikael Åkerfeldt as Fear. It also featured a choir, nicknamed the "Epic Rock Choir", that Lucassen hired during production to perform choirs for the album The Diary by his and van Giersbergen's new project The Gentle Storm.

Synopsis 
After a car accident, a man ("Me") falls into a coma, and, in his head, is confronted with his past, his emotions, and his current situation as he lays trapped inside his own mind. The circumstances surrounding the accident are mysterious, as Me ploughed into a tree on a deserted road in broad daylight. Following this, he slips into a twenty-day coma. While each day is represented by a single song on the album the theater show uses stylistic means like several repetitions. Each song follows a slightly different format, though there are major common themes, such as the presence of Me's manifest emotions in his dream world including Fear, Reason, and Pride; the presence of Me's Wife, his Best Friend, a doctor and a nurse at his bedside; and the past events that Me is forced to reflect on.

The plot builds from Me’s early broken state to his eventual rebirth as a new and better man. His own dark past, in which he suffered beneath an abusive Father, was driven to become merciless by school bullies, and eventually betrayed his closest friend for his own benefit; is intertwined with the plot surrounding Wife and Best Friend, eventually revealing the cause of the accident: Me had witnessed the two sharing an intimate moment, and had swerved his car into a tree in his despair. The three eventually come clean and forgive each other, leading Me to conquer his negative emotions and escape his nightmarish prison.

After the final song a computerised voice announces the shut-down of the Dream Sequencer. Later the voice of a Forever (Arjen Anthony Lucassen) then speaks the final words "The Human Equation.... I remember", tying its events into the overall Ayreon plot that began with the album The Final Experiment.

Track listing 

Sources:

Personnel

Cast 
Returning from The Human Equation
 James LaBrie (Dream Theater) as Me
 Marcela Bovio (Stream of Passion) as Wife
 Irene Jansen as Passion
 Magnus Ekwall (The Quill) as Pride
 Heather Findlay (ex-Mostly Autumn) as Love
 Devon Graves (Deadsoul Tribe / Psychotic Waltz) as Agony
 Eric Clayton (Saviour Machine) as Reason

New
 Jermain "Wudstik" van der Bogt as Best Friend
 Anneke van Giersbergen (ex-The Gathering) as Fear
 Mike Mills (Toehider) as Rage and Father
 Anita van der Hoeven as Mom
 Peter Moltmaker as Doctor
 Nienke Verboom as Nurse
 Katinka van der Harst as Nurse
 Arjen Anthony Lucassen as Forever of the Stars
 Epic Rock Choir - backing vocals

Instrumentalists 
 Returning from The Human Equation
 Joost van den Broek (ex-After Forever) - musical director
 Ed Warby (Gorefest, Hail Of Bullets) - drums
 Jeroen Goossens - flutes and woodwinds

New
 Marcel Coenen (Sun Caged) - guitar
 Freek Gielen - guitar
 Johan van Stratum (Stream of Passion) - bass
 Erik van Ittersum - keyboards
 Ruben Wijga (ReVamp) - keyboards
 Ben Mathot - violin
 Maaike Peterse (Kingfisher Sky) - cello

Charts

References

External links 
 Official Ayreon Website

2016 live albums
Ayreon albums